Animashaun is a Yoruba surname common in Nigeria. It means “the one who gives freely”.

Notable people with the surname 

 Ayo Animashaun, Nigerian entertainment executive 
 Mustapha Adamu Animashaun, Nigerian astrologer
 Samuel Animashaun Perry, also known as Broda Shaggi, Nigerian comedian

References